Sadus is an American thrash metal band from Antioch, California, active from 1985 to 2015, and reunited in 2017. Originally a quartet, the band's sound fuses thrash metal with death metal, featuring highly technical musicianship. They are known for the unique death growl of vocalist Darren Travis, and bassist Steve Di Giorgio. During their career, Sadus has released five studio albums, one compilation album and four demos, and had only one lineup change, when guitarist Rob Moore left the band in 1993; instead of replacing him, the band continued as a trio.

History

Formation, early albums and split with Rob Moore (1985–1993) 
Sadus was formed in 1985 by vocalist Darren Travis, guitarist Rob Moore, bassist Steve Di Giorgio and drummer Jon Allen. A year later, the band would release their demo tape D.T.P. (Death to Posers). These sessions led directly to the inclusion of two tracks on the 1987 Raging Death compilation album. Quick to capitalize on this achievement Sadus stuck their hands in their pockets to self finance the debut album pulling in Metal Church guitarist John Marshall as producer. The pace of progress was quickened as a deal with label Roadrunner Records was secured resulting in a further album Swallowed in Black and touring with the likes of Sepultura and Obituary.

Sadus was put on hold for 1991 as Di Giorgio opted to assist Death for their Human album. With this added exposure Roadrunner re-released the Illusions debut retitled Chemical Exposure as Sadus regrouped for a summer American tour opening for Morbid Angel. Although a further album for Roadrunner, 1992's A Vision of Misery, resulted in a European headline tour, Sadus found itself labelless upon their return. Further setbacks occurred when Di Giorgio was enticed back to Death for the Individual Thought Patterns album and a subsequent year-long bout of touring. Di Giorgio was to return for club shows with Sadus but before any momentum could be gained Moore bailed out.

Sadus as a trio, Elements of Anger and hiatus (1993–2005) 
Instead of replacing Moore, Sadus continued as a trio crafting the Scott Burns produced Elements of Anger in 1997. The in demand Di Giorgio, along with drummer Jon Allen, also operated a side project Dragonheart (later Dragonlord) with former Vicious Rumours and present day Testament guitarist Steve Smyth and his fellow Testament six-stringer Eric Peterson. Di Giorgio teamed up with Iced Earth in late 2000. News during the summer of 2002 would reveal that frontman Darren Travis and bassist Steve Di Giorgio was embarking on another all star union billed as Suicide Shift. The project allied the Sadus pairing with Testament vocalist Chuck Billy as well as drummer Per Moller Jensen of The Haunted and guest guitar from the much travelled, Death and Cancer guitarist James Murphy. The Hammerheart label would put the band's original Death To Posers 1986 demo onto CD in 2003, adding a brace of cuts from a 1988 session, Certain Death, as a bonus.

Sadus announced they were to partner up with fellow thrash veterans Nasty Savage and high-profile Finnish act Finntroll for European mainland dates in December. However, just days after the official press release confirming these shows the band withdrew as drummer Jon Allen's commitments to his 11-year-old daughter, who had just undergone open heart surgery, took precedence.

Despite Steve Di Giorgio commitments in 2004 to Testament, the band did increase activity that year. In April the group toured Europe, taking in shows in Greece, Italy, Sweden and appearing at Norway's Inferno Metal Festival in Oslo. Di Giorgio then took time out to record with Artension then hit the European festival circuit with Testament. Gigs in August marked a first for Sadus as they toured Chile alongside Torturer whilst on South American dates. New Sadus material would be laid down throughout September and October before Di Giorgio joined the ranks of Sebastian Bach's band for further European touring in December. The bassist would also be announced as a contributor to recordings for Norwegian act Scariot in early 2005.

Out for Blood and another hiatus (2006–2016) 
Sadus, together with producer Brage Finstad, entered Trident Studios in Pacheco, California to record their fifth album for a late summer 2006 release via Mascot Records. In March 2006 Jon Allen manned the drum kit for live work with Testament. That same month found Di Giorgio involving himself in a studio collaboration with singer Björn Strid, of Soilwork, Terror 2000 and Coldseed, Glen Alvelais from Forbidden, Testament and LD/50 and Jeremy Colson of the Steve Vai band, Marty Friedman, Michael Schenker, Apartment 26, Dali'S Dilemma and LD/50 repute.

On November 18 the band appeared at the Monterrey Metal Fest event at the Auditorio Coca-Cola in Mexico alongside Blind Guardian, Cathedral, U.D.O., Edguy, Obituary, Deicide, Leaves' Eyes, Bludgeon, Vainglory, Hydrogyn and Joe Stump's Reign of Terror. Sadus was announced as teaming up with Destruction, Hirax and Municipal Waste for a North American tour throughout January and February 2007. However, the group dropped off these dates as new year broke. Sadus lined up the South American 'Fuera Por Sangre' dates hitting Venezuela, Ecuador and Colombia in April prior to supporting Obituary in Mexico during May. In 2009 Sadus veterans Jon Allen and Steve Di Giorgio were noted as founder members of Futures End. Di Giorgio rejoined Testament in 2014 and played on their 2016 album Brotherhood of the Snake.

Reunion (2017–present) 
On August 20, 2017, Darren Travis confirmed via Facebook that Sadus would be releasing new material. In October of that year, Travis posted two videos from the studio teasing new music from the band. At first, it was unclear whether bassist Steve Di Giorgio and drummer Jon Allen were part of the reunion, but in November 2017, Travis told Blabbermouth.net: "I have been working on new material for quite sometime with drummer Jon Allen in his personal studio in Texas. I am going to record again in Trident Studios in the next few weeks for two/three new tracks. Guitars and voice. Teasers will be posted on Facebook via YouTube links. Then full songs soon."

On November 18, 2022, Sadus announced that they had signed a deal with Nuclear Blast Records for the 2023 release of their new album, and on the same day, they released their first song in 16 years called "It's the Sickness".

Discography

Studio albums 
Illusions (1988) (Chemical Exposure on the CD and cassette editions)
Swallowed in Black (1990)
A Vision of Misery (1992)
Elements of Anger (1997)
Out for Blood (2006)

Compilations 
Chronicles of Chaos (1997)

Demos 
D.T.P. (1986) (originally released as a demo, reissued as a studio album with Certain Death in 2003)
Certain Death (1987)
The Wake of Severity (1989)
Red Demo (1994)

Splits 
Raging Death (1987) (split release with bands Lethal Presence, Xecutioner who would later change their name to Obituary, Betrayel, and R.A.V.A.G.E. who would later change their name to Atheist)

Band members 
 Current lineup
Darren Travis – lead vocals, guitar (1985–2015, 2017–present), bass (2022–present)
Jon Allen – drums (1985–2015, 2017–present)

 Former
Steve Di Giorgio – bass, backing vocals (1985–2015, 2017)
Rob Moore – guitar (1985–1993)

Timeline

Notes 
 Although 1984 is commonly listed as the band's founding date, one of the members has claimed that the Sadus name was suggested in 1985 by their friend Rick Rogers.

References

External links 

Thrash metal musical groups from California
Roadrunner Records artists
Musical groups established in 1985
Musical groups disestablished in 2015
Musical groups reestablished in 2017
Taraneh Records artists